The 1962–63 British Home Championship football tournament came after disappointment for the home nations in the 1962 FIFA World Cup, for which only England qualified, only to be beaten 3–1 in the quarter-finals by eventual winners Brazil. The Home Championship was won by a Scottish team which dominated all their matches and whitewashed their opponents for the second year in a row as part of a period of temporary but pronounced dominance.

The Scots and English both started strongly, beating Wales and Ireland away respectively. This was followed with similar victories at home in the second fixture, England comprehensively outplaying Wales in a 4–0 win, whilst a Denis Law inspired Scotland hammered the Irish 5–1 with Law scoring four times. In the final games, Wales gained some points by beating Ireland, but the deciding match of the tournament was closely fought between England and Scotland at Wembley Stadium, from which Scotland emerged eventual 2–1 winners to claim the championship.

Table

Results

References

1963
1963 in British sport
1962–63 in Northern Ireland association football
1962–63 in English football
1962–63 in Scottish football
1962–63 in Welsh football